Salvador Agron (April 24, 1943 – April 22, 1986), a.k.a. "The Capeman", was a Puerto Rican gang member who murdered two teenagers in a Hell's Kitchen park in 1959. Agron mistook both teenagers for members of a gang called the Norsemen who were supposed to show up for a gang fight. Agron was the subject of the musical The Capeman by Paul Simon.

Early years
Agron was born in the city of Mayagüez on the western coast of Puerto Rico.  When he was young, his parents divorced and his mother had custody of him and his sister, Aurea. She earned a living by working at a local convent; however, according to Agron, he and his sister were mistreated by the nuns. His mother met and married a Pentecostal minister and the family moved to New York City. Agron's relationship with his stepfather was difficult, and he asked his mother to send him back to Puerto Rico to live with his father. He returned to Puerto Rico, by which time his father had remarried. One day the teenage Agron found the body of his stepmother, who had committed suicide by hanging herself. Agron began to get into trouble and was sent to the Industrial School of Mayagüez.

The Capeman
His father sent him back to his mother in New York, and in 1958 he became a member of notorious teenage street gang the Mau Maus from the Fort Greene neighborhood of Brooklyn.  He later joined another gang called the Vampires after meeting Tony Hernandez, the gang's president. On August 29, 1959, the Vampires were on their way to "rumble" (street gang fight) with a gang composed mostly of  Irish Americans called the Norsemen. When they arrived, they mistook a group of teenagers for members of the Norsemen. Agron stabbed two of the teenagers to death and fled the scene. The two victims were Anthony Krzesinski and Robert Young, Jr.

The murders made headlines in New York and the city went into an uproar. Agron was called "The Capeman" because he wore a black cape with red lining during the fight, while Hernandez was labeled "The Umbrella Man" because he used an umbrella with a sharp end as a weapon. After Agron was captured, he was quoted as saying: "I don't care if I burn, my mother could watch me."

Incarceration
Agron was sentenced to death, which made the 16-year-old the youngest prisoner ever sent to death row in New York.  While many New Yorkers were outraged about the killings, others like former First Lady Eleanor Roosevelt and Robert Young, the father of one of the victims, campaigned for leniency. While on death row, Agron became a born-again Christian. In prison he learned to read and write, earning his high school equivalency diploma. He wrote poems about his life and street life, including "The Political Identity of Salvador Agron; Travel Log of Thirty-Four Years", "Uhuru Sasa! (A Freedom Call)", and "Justice, Law and Order", which were published by some newspapers. He later earned his Bachelor of Arts degree in sociology and philosophy from the State University of New York in New Paltz, New York. His death sentence was commuted to life in prison by Governor Nelson Rockefeller in 1962.

Escape and release from prison
In December 1976, Governor Hugh Carey reduced Agron's sentence, making him eligible for release in 1977. Agron was enrolled at SUNY New Paltz while spending his nights at the Fishkill Correctional Facility. However, in April 1977, Agron took flight and absconded to Phoenix where he was captured two weeks later and brought back to New York. In November 1977, Agron went on trial for his escape (his lawyer was William Kunstler), but was found not guilty, by reason of "mental illness", of the charge of absconding. Agron was finally released from prison on November 1, 1979. A television movie based on his life was proposed and he set up a fund for the families of his victims with the money he received.

Later years
Agron began working as a youth counselor, and spoke out against gang violence for over five years. On April 16, 1986, he was admitted to a hospital with pneumonia and internal bleeding and died six days later at age 42, two days before his 43rd birthday.

In popular culture
 Conversations with the Capeman: The Untold Story of Salvador Agron was written by Richard Jacoby, with an introduction by Hubert Selby, Jr. 
 The Capeman, a Broadway musical written by Paul Simon and Derek Walcott was based on the life of Agron. The play opened  at the Marquis Theatre in 1998.
 The character of Anthony "Batman" Aposto in the 1961 film The Young Savages is loosely based upon Agron and his tendency to wear capes.
 In 2009, Puerto Rican singer Obie Bermúdez, together with Danny Rivera, Ray de la Paz, Claudette Sierra and Frankie Negrón, participated in a performance of Songs of the Capeman, based on Paul Simon's play, under the direction of Oscar Hernández and his Spanish Harlem Orquestra.

Bibliography
 Agron, Salvador, Rubinstein, Annette T., and Kresky, Harry.  Salvador Agron: Puerto Rican, Prisoner, Poet, Charter Group for a Pledge of Conscience, 1978.
 Jacoby, Richard. Conversations with the Capeman: The Untold Story of Salvador Agron, University of Wisconsin Press: Madison, 2004.

See also

List of Puerto Ricans

Notes

References

1943 births
1986 deaths
People from Mayagüez, Puerto Rico
Puerto Rican poets
Puerto Rican people convicted of murder
Puerto Rican prisoners sentenced to death
Prisoners sentenced to death by New York (state)
People convicted of murder by New York (state)
State University of New York at New Paltz alumni
Gang members
Deaths from pneumonia in New York City
Deaths from bleeding
20th-century American poets
20th-century American male writers
People paroled from life sentence
Recipients of American gubernatorial clemency